Waiting for Your Letter is the second EP by the American singer-songwriter Cary Brothers.

Track listing
All songs written by Cary Brothers.

"Ride" - 3:15
"Waiting for Your Letter" - 2:30
"Loneliest Girl in the World" - 3:04
"Wasted One" - 4:45
"Forget About You" - 4:09

External links
Cary Brothers website

Cary Brothers albums
2005 EPs
Albums produced by Chad Fischer